Operation Sea Dragon  was a series of American-led naval operations during the Vietnam War They began in October 1966 to interdict sea lines of communications and supply going south from North Vietnam to South Vietnam, and to destroy land targets with naval gunfire. Sea Dragon assets were a part of Task Force 70.8, whose mission was naval shore bombardment. At the height of the operation in May 1967, two cruisers and 12 destroyers were assigned Sea Dragon missions. Targets included radar stations, boat repair facilities, bridges, and surface-to-air missile sites. Seventh Fleet calculated that after one year of operations that Sea Dragon had sunk or damaged 2,000 logistics craft. During the operation lifetime 29 Sea Dragon ships damaged by shore battery fire with five sailors killed and 26 wounded. The operation ended on 31 October 1968 when President Lyndon B. Johnson ordered a halt to all attacks on North Vietnam and the Seventh Fleet assets withdrew to south of the DMZ

See also 
Operation Market Time
Operation Rolling Thunder

Notes

Footnotes

Bibliography

  
 

Campaigns of the Vietnam War
1966 in Vietnam
Military operations involving the United States
Military operations involving Vietnam
Military operations of the Vietnam War